Tilonia is a village in Ajmer district in Rajasthan, India. It is home of the NGO, Barefoot College, founded by renowned social worker Bunker Roy. Tilonia is also home of eShala.org, Online educational portal co-founded by Kartar Jat. This village has become a model for all remote villages for education, economic and social development. Tilonia is also known as education hub with its meritorious students in Navoday Vidyalaya and village school. Main occupation is farming but nowadays people are working in Indian Army, NTPC, BSNL, Indian Railway, Police and various other State and Central Government jobs from Group-D to Sr. Manager levels.

Education

In Tilonia village, there are three day schools:
 Government school - govt of Rajasthan
 Shiksha Niketan School - Barefoot college
 Shivam Public School
 Bal Sanskar School

Industry

In Tilonia village, there are following industries:
 Shree Ganesh Industries
 eShala.org

Location and Transportation
By road
 Kishangarh - 11 km
 Ajmer - 35 km
 Jaipur - 107 km

By rail
Tilonia is situated between Jaipur-Ajmer rail line and Tilonia railway station is the nearest station.

By air
Kishangarh airport is proposed nearest airport at a distance of 11 km
Jaipur airport- 115 km

References

External links
 tilonia.com
 eShala.org

Villages in Ajmer district